Thomas E. Hosier (September 15, 1942 – October 28, 2015) was an American football coach.  He served as the head football coach at Eureka College in Eureka, Illinois from 1974 to 1978, Macalester College in Saint Paul, Minnesota from 1979 to 1989, and Winona State University in Winona, Minnesota from 1990 to 1995, compiling a career college football coaching record of 88–124–4. 

Hosier died on October 28, 2015, after a brief illness.

Head coaching record

References

1942 births
2015 deaths
Bemidji State Beavers football coaches
Eureka Red Devils football coaches
Gustavus Adolphus Golden Gusties football coaches
Macalester Scots football coaches
Michigan Wolverines football coaches
Winona State Warriors football coaches
DePauw University alumni
People from South Haven, Michigan